Gordon Rule (born March 1, 1946) is a former defensive back in the National Football League. He played two seasons with the Green Bay Packers.

References

1946 births
Living people
American football defensive backs
Dartmouth Big Green football players
Green Bay Packers players
Players of American football from Columbus, Ohio